Hear Me Good is a 1957 American comedy film written and directed by Don McGuire. The film stars Hal March, Joe E. Ross, Merry Anders, Jean Willes, Milton Frome and Joey Faye. The film was released in October 1957, by Paramount Pictures.

Plot

Cast 
Hal March as Marty Holland
Joe E. Ross as Max Crane
Merry Anders as Ruth Collins
Jean Willes as Rita Hall
Milton Frome as Mr. Ross
Joey Faye as Charlie Cooper
Richard Bakalyan as Hermie
Tom Duggan as TV Director

References

External links 
 

1957 films
Paramount Pictures films
American comedy films
1957 comedy films
Films about beauty pageants
1950s English-language films
1950s American films